Markville may refer to:

Markville Shopping Centre
Arna Township, Pine County, Minnesota
Markville Secondary School
Raymerville – Markville East, Ontario